The Korean People's Army Special Operation Force (KPASOF; Korean: 조선인민군 특수작전군; Hanja: 朝鮮人民軍 特殊作戰軍; Chosŏn-inmin'gun teugsujagjeongun) consists of specially equipped and trained elite military units trained to perform military, political, or psychological operations for North Korea. The units are active in testing the defenses of South Korea and have been detected operating in or around South Korea many times in the decades since the end of the Korean War.  It is estimated that there are 200,000 SOF soldiers.

Mission 
The missions of the KPA Special Operation Forces are to breach the fixed defense of South Korea, to create a "second front" in the enemy's rear area, and to conduct battlefield and strategic reconnaissance.

History 
The official date of formation for the SOF is hard to come by, but reports of activity by forces with the purpose for special operations have been commonplace since October 30, 1968. On this date, North Korean maritime commandos landed on beaches from Samcheok to Uljin, South Korea and after a series of battles retreated back to North Korea. Kim Il-sung himself was quoted as saying the Special Operation Force (then known as the VIII Special Purposes Corps) "is the strongest elite force of the entire Korean People's Army and is the unique vanguard force of the Armed Forces of the Democratic People's Republic of Korea."

2017 Pyongyang parade
On 15 April 2017, a new unit of KPA special forces wearing modern combat gear, including night-vision goggles and plate carriers, marched along with elements of the Korean People's Army in a parade on the 105th anniversary of the birth of the founder of North Korea Kim Il-sung in Pyongyang. North Korean state media confirmed the new elite unit is intended to counter the U.S. Navy SEALs and Republic of Korea Navy Special Warfare Flotilla, calling it the Lightning Commandos.

Weapons

 Type 88-2 "Top Folding Stock" – North Korean AK-74 copy used with helical magazine attached, now being used alongside the Type 98 as well. The Type 88-2 features a more standard AK-74 receiver frame while the Type 98 is slightly more modified.
 Type 98 – Variant of the Type 88-2 "Top Folding Stock"  with a Helical Magazine that is believed to hold between 75 and 150 rounds of 5.45×39mm and it has a few exterior modifications in the shape of the weapons near where the stock folds. Features shorter barrel than the Type 88.
M16A1 – Locally made copies. Seen in use by North Korean Commandos infiltrating South Korea via midget submarine in 1996, known as the 1996 Gangneung submarine infiltration incident.
K2 – Locally made copies in production since the 1990s. North Korean commandos with imitation South Korean military digital camo uniforms and K2 rifle copies were observed by South Korean army soldiers during their shelling of South Korea across along the Western Front in 2015.
 Baek Du San – North Korean version of the CZ-75 pistol, the KPA Special Operation Force model features a larger magazine base plate and features a tactical wooden grip in a chest holster, unlike the standard Baek Du San given to standard soldiers, or the chrome plate engraved one given to generals and other high-ranking officers.
 Sterling Submachine Gun – Used by North Korean commandos during infiltration missions into South Korea.
 vz.61 – Used by elite North Korean commandos.

Organization

Airborne 
North Korean commandos use the antiquated Antonov An-2 to infiltrate by air. The An-2 can deliver paratroopers by airdrop or airland. With the An-2's small airframe, it is possible to land on a highway and insert paratroopers on the ground.

Reconnaissance Brigades 
Sometimes known as "sniper" brigades, they are part of the ground intelligence effort of the KPA. These units also have the ability to perform Direct Action. They train and equip to seize or destroy strategic targets within South Korean territory. Additionally, it is suspected that these units carry out assassination attempts.

Light Infantry 
KPA light infantry battalions are found in places like North China Sea. The light battalions are similar to their amphibious light infantry counterparts except for the absence of the additional marine training. The major focus of the light infantry is the "rapid infiltration and disruption of enemy rear areas through concealed movement". The missions of the light infantry include seizure of forward area lines of communication, and destruction of high-payoff targets such as nuclear or chemical sites. In keeping with their name, they are lightly armed and equipped with small arms and anti-tank weapons. For years, the light infantry SOF was known to be one of the few special forces of the world without body armor: no body armor was clearly seen in videos during training or military exercises. Finally in summer 2012 surfaced few pictures with special forces showing body armour during training. It is noted that the armor may not necessarily be military grade, instead being of the kevlar variety, similar to the PASGT.

Maritime SOF 
Estimates reveal that the North Koreans can deliver over 7,000 SOF personnel to each of South Korea's coastlines. Based on the number of ships available to the KPA special forces, they could deliver 5,000 of these soldiers in one lift (approximately 102 amphibious craft). It is expected that these special forces once ashore, will attempt to infiltrate South Korea's rugged terrain to attack the South Koreans in their rear areas just before and during the renewed commencement of hostilities between the two countries. Further, the added capability of a small ship with "stealthy" characteristics enables the commandos the ability to ferry to the South Korean coastline.

Like other special forces around the world, close coordination with their sister services provides the needed transportation around the battlefield. For the Maritime SOF, the most commonly used component for modern infiltration has been using the KPA Navy's submarines. The KPA Navy has 24 Romeo class diesel electric submarines. These submarines are used primarily in coastal areas and are an excellent platform to deposit units offshore. Specially outfitted Sang-O class submarines carry a small crew of nineteen and serve the sole purpose of coastal infiltration. Finally, the KPA Navy possesses at least forty-five midget submarines ideally suited to infiltrate two to five man teams into South Korean territory. Such small submarines prove difficult to detect among the rugged coastlines of the Korean Peninsula.

References 

Special forces of North Korea
Military units and formations of the Korean People's Army Ground Force